Jebel Aqra is a limestone mountain located on the Syrian–Turkish border near the mouth of the Orontes River on the Mediterranean Sea. Rising from a narrow coastal plain, Jebel Aqra is a mariners' landmark which gathers thunderstorms.

The mountain was a cult site in ancient Canaanite religion and continuing through classical antiquity. A mound of ash and debris remains; an archaeological investigation was broken off because of military restrictions imposed due to the mountain's border location.

Names

History

Jebel Aqra has a long history as a sacred mountain.

The Hurrians called it  and considered it the home of their storm god Teshub. The Hittites continued his worship, celebrating Teshub's victory over the sea in the Song of Kumarbi found in their capital Hattusa. They also celebrated the mountain in its own right, naming it as a divine guarantor on their treaties and observing rites in its honor.

Baʿal is now often identified with Hadad and his variations understood as local cults. The form Baʿal Zephon was worshipped widely: his temple at Ugarit held a sandstone relief dedicated to him by a royal scribe in Egypt and the king of Tyre called on him as a divine witness on a treaty with the emperor of Assyria in 677 BCE.

In ancient Canaanite religion, Mount Sapan was sometimes accounted as the home of all the gods, not only Baʿal and his sister. As Mount Zaphon, it appears in that role in the Hebrew Scriptures' Book of Isaiah, along with the Mount of the Congregation. From its importance and its position at the northern end of Canaan, it also became a metonym and then the word for the direction "north" in the Hebrew language.

Even closer, the earliest Hellenic foothold in the Levant lies at the beach on its northern flank at Al Mina. Here Euboeans and Cypriotes experienced some of their earliest on-site experience of northwest Semitic cultures, from the early eighth century BCE onwards. "The Hittite name persisted in neo-Hittite culture into the ninth century [BCE] and so when Greeks settled on the north side of Mount Hazzi they continued to call its main peak 'Mount Kasios'", Lane Fox points out, observing that it was the Mount Olympus of the Near East.

The cult of the god of the mountain was transferred, by interpretatio graeca, to Zeus Kasios, the "Zeus of Mount Kasios", similar to Ras Kouroun in the Sinai. Tiles from the Greco-Roman sanctuary at the site, stamped with the god's name, were reused in the Christian monastery that came to occupy the eastern, landward slopes of Kazios.

When kings and emperors climbed Mount Kasios to sacrifice at its peak sanctuary, it was a notable cultural occasion. Seleucus I Nicator sought there the advice of Zeus in locating his foundation, a Seleuceia (one of many) on the coast. Coins struck there as late as the first century BCE still show the city's emblem, the thunderbolt, sometimes placed upon the cushion of a throne. In the winter of 114/15 CE Trajan was spared in a major earthquake that struck Antioch; commemorative coins were struck featuring the shrine of Zeus Kasios, with its pointed roof on pillars, and a representation of its rounded sacred stone, or betyl. Trajan's adoptive son Hadrian accompanied him; he returned in 130 AD to scale the mountain at night, no doubt, Lane Fox remarks, to witness the rising of the sun, visible for several minutes from the peak, while the land below lay still in darkness; it was said later that a thunderbolt at the peak struck the animal he was about to sacrifice. In spring 363 the last pagan emperor, Julian, scaled the mountain, where he had an epiphanic vision of Zeus Kasios, according to his friend and correspondent Libanius.

Greek theophoric names Kassiodora and Kassiodorus, equally a "gift of Kasios", recall a vow of one or both parents made to ensure fertile conception.

Christian hermits were drawn to the mountain; Barlaam challenged its  demons by founding a monastery near the treeline on its eastern slopes, and Simeon Stylites the Younger stood for forty years on a pillar near its northern flanks until his death in 592.

Archaeologists only reached as far as the Hellenistic strata before the site was closed, as it lies in a Turkish military zone on its border with Syria.

Notes

References

Citations

Bibliography

 .
 . 
 .
 .
 .
 
 

Hebrew Bible mountains
Aqraa
Aqraa
Syria–Turkey border
Aqraa
Landforms of Hatay Province
Baal
Anat